Murray County may refer to: 

In Australia:
Murray County, New South Wales
Murray County, Western Australia

In the United States:
 Murray County, Georgia 
 Murray County, Minnesota 
 Murray County, Oklahoma 

County name disambiguation pages